Pablo Colín Martínez (born 29 June 1937) is a Mexican racewalker. He competed in the men's 50 kilometres walk at the 1968 Summer Olympics.

References

1937 births
Living people
Athletes (track and field) at the 1967 Pan American Games
Athletes (track and field) at the 1968 Summer Olympics
Mexican male racewalkers
Olympic athletes of Mexico
Place of birth missing (living people)
Pan American Games competitors for Mexico
20th-century Mexican people